Leipzig Homicide (SOKO Leipzig) is a German crime drama television series first broadcast on 31 January 2001 on ZDF. More than 400 episodes have been screened since. On 12 November 2008, the first of a two-part crossover between SOKO Leipzig and British police procedural The Bill, titled "Proof of Life", was aired, with the same version being shown on both ZDF and British television network ITV. Soko Leipzig is the second offshoot of SOKO München, launched in 1978 under the name SOKO 5113. "SOKO" is an abbreviation of the German word Sonderkommission, which means "special investigative team".

Synopsis
The series details the investigative work done by the special commission of the Leipzig police. The team, consisting of Hajo Trautzschke, Jan Maybach, Ina Zimmermann, and Tom Kowalski, mostly investigates crimes such as murder and manslaughter. They are supported by team assistant Olivia Fareedi, coroners Sabine Rossi and Mara Stein, as well as laboratory assistant Lorenz Rettig and prosecutor Alexander Binz. In cases concerning sexual offenses, Dagmar Schnee is also on the team.

Crossovers
On 3 April 2013, five SOKO teams were brought together for a five-part special titled SOKO – Der Prozess. In it, the teams from Munich, Cologne, Leipzig, Stuttgart, and Wismar have to solve the murder of a police officer. The five episodes were shown across Germany from 30 September to 4 October 2013.

A crossover episode with SOKO Donau, titled "Der vierte Mann", was broadcast on ORF on 2 November 2019 and ZDF on 8 November 2019. The screenplay was based on a true story related to the Viennese political activist Rudolfine Steindling.

Cast and characters

Current

Former

Episodes

Gallery
Shooting locations and sets

Special

In April 2013, a five-part crossover between five ZDF SOKO series, titled SOKO – Der Prozess, began filming. The teams included in the show are 5113, Cologne, Leipzig, Stuttgart, and Wismar.

See also
 List of German television series

References

External links
 Leipzig Homicide at ZDF
 Leipzig Homicide at UFA
 Leipzig Homicide at fernsehserien.de
 

German drama television series
2001 German television series debuts
2010s German television series
German crime television series
2000s German police procedural television series
2010s German police procedural television series
2020s German police procedural television series
German-language television shows
German television spin-offs
ZDF original programming